Donald Parry may refer to:
 Donald W. Parry, professor of Hebrew Bible
 Donald Parry (rugby league)
 Donald Parry (cricketer)